Sir Henry Cecil Buckingham CBE (2 May 1867 – 1 August 1931) was a Conservative Party politician in the United Kingdom.

Biography
He was educated at Harrow School. He was elected at the 1922 general election as Member of Parliament (MP) for the Guildford constituency in Surrey, and held the seat in three further general elections.

He was knighted in 1911, and awarded a CBE in 1920 for his work as a member of the City of London Advisory Committee of the Ministry of National Service.

He died in office in 1931 aged 64 and is buried in the Buckingham family vault in Highgate Cemetery (west side).

References

External links 
 

1867 births
1931 deaths
Burials at Highgate Cemetery
People educated at Harrow School
Conservative Party (UK) MPs for English constituencies
Knights Bachelor
Commanders of the Order of the British Empire
UK MPs 1923–1924
UK MPs 1924–1929
UK MPs 1929–1931
Politicians awarded knighthoods
Members of the Parliament of the United Kingdom for Guildford